Jean-François Chossy (born 4 May 1947 in Montbrison, Loire) is a member of the National Assembly of France.  He represents the Loire department,  and is a member of the Christian Democratic Party.

Biography
Jean-François Chossy focused his parliamentary activity on the issue of disability. He is the author of Law on Disability of 11 February 2005.

References

1947 births
Living people
People from Montbrison, Loire
Politicians from Auvergne-Rhône-Alpes
Union for French Democracy politicians
Union for a Popular Movement politicians
Christian Democratic Party (France) politicians
Deputies of the 10th National Assembly of the French Fifth Republic
Deputies of the 11th National Assembly of the French Fifth Republic
Deputies of the 12th National Assembly of the French Fifth Republic
Deputies of the 13th National Assembly of the French Fifth Republic